The Treno Servizio Regionale (TSR) are a series of double-decker EMUs used by the Lombard railway company Trenord for the commuter services around Milan, and particularly for the suburban lines.

Description 
Each train is composed by several railcars; some of them have a cab and a wheelchair bay for disabled people (MCH), and some of them have neither (M).

″MCH″-railcars were numbered by LeNord as E.711, ″M″-ones as E.710. In complex were built 208 MCH and 252 M, that can be merged forming trains from 3 (MCH + M + MCH) to 6 cars (MCH + M + M + M + M + MCH).

History 
The TSR were conceived by AnsaldoBreda and Firema as an evolution of the TAF-EMUs built in the 1990s. The first unit was delivered to the railway company LeNord (later merged into Trenord) on 1 August 2006.

The last train was delivered on 31 March 2012.

Operators

References

Bibliography 
 Vittorio Mario Cortese, Potenza dei TSR! In: ″I Treni″ Nr. 300 & 301 (January & February 2008), p. 16–21 & 12–17.

External links 

FNM electric railcars and multiple units
Double-decker EMUs
AnsaldoBreda multiple units
3000 V DC multiple units